Knockout Blessing is a 2018 Nigerian action thriller film directed by Dare Olaitan and co-produced by Olaitan with Olufemi Ogunsanwo, Bibi Olaitan, and Niyi Olaitan. The film stars Ade Laoye with Bucci Franklin, Ademola Adedoyin, Linda Ejiofor, Meg Otanwa and Tope Tedela in supporting roles. The film revolves around a girl Blessing whose ambition is to achieve success in her dreams by eradicating poverty. However she unexpectedly moved to criminal underworld and gradually reached to Nigerian political system.

The film received mostly positive critics acclaim and screened worldwide.

Cast
 Ade Laoye as Blessing
 Bucci Franklin as Dagogo
 Ademola Adedoyin as Gowon 
 Linda Ejiofor as Oby
 Meg Otanwa as Hannah
 Tope Tedela as Yomi
 Gbenga Titiloye as Baba
 Adideji Abimbola as Feyikewa

References

External links 
 

2018 films
English-language Nigerian films
Nigerian thriller films
2010s English-language films